John Martin (10 December 1904 – March 1984) was an English footballer who played as an outside left in the Football League for Darlington, Leeds United, Accrington Stanley, Bury and Doncaster Rovers. He was on the books of Reading, without playing League football for them, and played non-league football for Hebburn Colliery, Connahs Quay & Shotton – with whom he won the Welsh Cup in 1929 – and Guildford City.

References

1904 births
1984 deaths
Sportspeople from Bishop Auckland
Footballers from County Durham
English footballers
Association football outside forwards
Hebburn Colliery F.C. players
Darlington F.C. players
Leeds United F.C. players
Accrington Stanley F.C. (1891) players
Connah's Quay & Shotton F.C. players
Bury F.C. players
Reading F.C. players
Guildford City F.C. players
Doncaster Rovers F.C. players
English Football League players